Ralph Nelson (August 12, 1916 – December 21, 1987) was an American film and television director, producer, writer, and actor. He was best known for directing Lilies of the Field (1963), Father Goose (1964), and Charly (1968), films which won Academy Awards.

Life and career
Nelson was born in Long Island City, New York. He served in the Army Air Corps as a flight instructor in World War II.

Before the war ended, he had a play on Broadway: "The Wind Is Ninety" ran from June to September 1945. Kirk Douglas was in the cast.

Nelson directed the acclaimed episode "A World of His Own" of The Twilight Zone (he should not be confused with The Twilight Zone's production manager, Ralph W. Nelson). He also directed both the television and film versions of Rod Serling's Requiem for a Heavyweight.

He directed Charly, the 1968 film version of Flowers for Algernon, for which Cliff Robertson won an Academy Award, as well as several racially provocative films in the 1960s and early 1970s, including  the Academy Award-winning Lilies of the Field, ...tick...tick...tick..., Christmas Lilies of the Field, The Wilby Conspiracy, and Soldier Blue. The starring role in "Lilies" led to Sidney Poitier winning the Academy Award for Best Actor.

Nelson also directed the Cary Grant comedy Father Goose, the offbeat Soldier in the Rain with Jackie Gleason and Steve McQueen, the crime story Once a Thief, and Rita Hayworth's last film, The Wrath of God. He both directed, and briefly appeared in, Duel at Diablo, starring James Garner and Sidney Poitier.

Nelson's other credits include several episodes of TV's Starsky & Hutch, the '70s camp horror classic Embryo, and A Hero Ain't Nothin' but a Sandwich.

A television drama about mounting the live show of Requiem for a Heavyweight called The Man in the Funny Suit was made in 1960, with Nelson both writing and directing. Nelson, Serling, Red Skelton, Keenan Wynn and Ed Wynn appeared in it as themselves.

He returned to TV in the late 1970s with a string of TV movies, including a sequel to Lilies of the Field called Christmas Lilies of the Field which starred Billy Dee Williams, Maria Schell, and Fay Hauser.

Death
He died in 1987 in Santa Monica, California at the age of 71.

Filmography

Director

Film
 Requiem for a Heavyweight (1962)
 Lilies of the Field (1963)
 Soldier in the Rain (1963)
 Fate Is the Hunter (1964)
 Father Goose (1964)
 Once a Thief (1965)
 Duel at Diablo (1966)
 Counterpoint (1968)
 Charly (1968)
 ...tick...tick...tick... (1970)
 Soldier Blue (1970)
 Flight of the Doves (1971)
 The Wrath of God (1972)
 The Wilby Conspiracy (1975)
 Embryo (1976)
 A Hero Ain't Nothin' but a Sandwich (1977)
Television
 Ford Startime - "The Jazz Singer" (1959)
 Playhouse 90 - "Requiem for a Heavyweight" (1956)
 Blood Money (1957)
 A World of His Own (1960)
 The Farmer's Daughter (1963) Episode: "The Speechmaker: Part 1"
 The Man Who Bought Paradise (1965)
 Lady of the House (1978)
 Because He's My Friend (1978)
 Christmas Lilies of the Field (1979)
 You Can't Go Home Again (1979)

Actor
 Stump Run (1959)
 Lilies of the Field (1963) - Mr. Ashton (uncredited)
 Duel at Diablo (1966) - Col. Foster
 Counterpoint (1968) - Belgian Officer (uncredited)
 Charly (1968) - Convention Speaker (uncredited)
 ...tick...tick...tick... (1970) - New York driver caught in speed trap (uncredited)
 Soldier Blue (1970) - Agent Long
 The Wrath of God (1972) - Executed Prisoner (uncredited)

References

External links

1953 Time Magazine

1916 births
1987 deaths
American male film actors
American film directors
Film producers from New York (state)
American male television actors
American male screenwriters
Emmy Award winners
Male actors from New York City
20th-century American male actors
20th-century American businesspeople
Screenwriters from New York (state)
People from Long Island City, Queens
20th-century American male writers
20th-century American screenwriters